Asau is a village in Tuvalu. It is the second largest village in Tuvalu and has a population of 650 (2009). Asau is on the island of Vaitupu.

References

External links

Populated places in Tuvalu
Vaitupu